{{Infobox website
| name = Drawception
| logo =
| logo_size = 150px
| logo_alt = 
| logo_caption = The game's mascot, known as Drawception D, D, DC D, or Big D.
| screenshot = Home Page of "Drawception".png
| collapsible = 
| collapsetext = 
| background = 
| screenshot_size = 
| screenshot_alt = 
| caption = Drawceptions website
| url = 
| commercial = 
| type = Web Game
| registration = Required, Free
| language = English
| num_users = 
| content_license = 
| programming_language = HTML and JavaScript
| owner = Blue Flame Labs
| launch_date = March 26, 2012
| revenue = 
| current_status = Active
| footnotes = 
}}Drawception''' is a multiplayer web-based drawing and guessing game. Considered similar to the telephone game, it was created by Jeremiah Freyholtz (aka "Reed") and released as an early beta on March 24, 2012, or March 26, 2012. The game is currently owned by Blue Flame Labs, which also owns MobyGames.

 Gameplay Drawception is a combination of drawing with telephone game rules that is played by 12, 15 or 24 random players, with some exceptions. (With specific settings a player can create 6 player games and in the past, there used to be glitched games with hundreds of players.) A game begins with a phrase, which is then drawn by a player. That drawing is then described by another player. This process repeats until all players have taken their turn. Once a game has been completed, players are notified and can view the resulting chain of drawings and descriptions. Games typically transform in unexpected ways and end completely different from where they began.

Players can optionally purchase cosmetic color palettes and tools from the game's virtual store. They are purchased with ducks, a virtual currency that they get from other players or with microtransactions, which, once made, gives the player access to Drawception Gold, which gives the ability to create Draw First games and award ducks to others as a way to reward helpful players.

As of 2022, the Drawception game is only functioning partially, as there are several code issues that have not been resolved.

 Reception Drawception has often been compared to games like Draw Something or Draw My Thing, and is noted to "combine the weird Pictionary-style guessing of Draw Something with the weird-to-weirder design of a game of Telephone". It has also been compared to Broken Picture Telephone'', an earlier online game.

The game has been recommended by publications such as Rock Paper Shotgun, Kotaku, PC Gamer and personalities such as Felicia Day, Harry Partridge and Jazza.

It received an honorable mention by Rock Paper Shotgun in their yearly roundup of video games.

References

External links 
 

Online games
Browser games
Drawing video games
2012 video games
Video games developed in the United States